The Nathaniel B. Palmer is an icebreaking research vessel (RVIB) owned by Offshore Service Vessels LLC, operated by Edison Chouest Offshore, Inc. and chartered by the United States National Science Foundation. The Nathaniel B. Palmer is tasked with extended scientific missions in the Antarctic. The Nathaniel B. Palmer was purpose-built for and delivered to the NSF by Edison Chouest Offshore's North American Shipbuilding facility in 1992. The Nathaniel B. Palmer is able to support up to two helicopters, accommodates up to 45 science and technical personnel, has a crew of 22 and is capable of missions lasting up to 65 days. The vessel is named after merchant mariner and ship builder Nathaniel Brown Palmer, credited by some historians as the first American to see Antarctica.

In February 2020, researchers aboard the vessel with the international Thwaites Glacier Offshore Research (THOR) project discovered Sif Island, located in Pine Island Bay of the Amundsen Sea, in Antarctica.

Gallery

References

External links
R/V Nathaniel B. Palmers current position
United States Antarctic Program Vessel Science and Operations
USAP Research Vessels news in The Antarctic Sun
Lockheed Martin Antarctic Support Contract

Icebreakers of the United States
Research vessels of the National Science Foundation
1992 ships
United States Antarctic Program